Since their first match in 2005, 60 women have represented the Australia national women's cricket team in Twenty20 Internationals (WT20Is). A Twenty20 International is a cricket match between two international representative teams, each having WT20I status, as determined by the International Cricket Council (ICC).

This list includes all players who have played at least one Twenty20 International match and is initially arranged in the order of debut appearance. Where more than one player won their first cap in the same match, those players are initially listed alphabetically by the last name at the time of debut.

Key

Players
Statistics are correct as of 26 February 2023.

Notes

See also
 List of Australia women Test cricketers
 List of Australia women ODI cricketers
 List of Australia national cricket captains

References

 
Twenty20 International,women
Australia
Twenty20